Wildridings is a suburb of Bracknell, in Berkshire, England.

Wildridings was built in the late 1960s as the new town started expanding beyond the original planned four estates. It was the first estate in the town to use the practice of naming roads in alphabetical order without 'Road' or 'Street', e.g. Arncliffe, Bishopdale, Crossfell - in this case after names of Yorkshire Dales. In addition road traffic and pedestrians routes were separated.

Facilities include a small shopping centre with post office, several public houses and Wildridings Primary School.. Mill Pond is a large lake offering leisure facilities, play areas, a skate park and angling. There is no industrial development.

The Offence (1973), a psychological thriller with Sean Connery and Ian Bannen, was filmed in Bracknell. The bulk of the outdoor scenes were taken from March to April, 1972 around Wildridings, specifically Arncliffe, Crossfell, Mill Pond and Mill Lane.

References

External links

Bracknell